Slavina may refer to:
 Slavina, Litija is a settlement southeast of Dole in the Municipality of Litija in central Slovenia
 Slavina, Postojna is a village south of Postojna on the way to Pivka in the Inner Carniola region of Slovenia
 Slavina (annelid), a genus of annelids in the family Naididae